Mshanets is a  village in Ternopil Raion, Ternopil Oblast of Western Ukraine. From 1975 to 1990 the village was called Peremozhne. It belongs to Bila rural hromada, one of the hromadas of Ukraine. The area of the village is 1,625 km2 and it has a population of 728 people. The local government is the Mshanetska village council, and includes the villages Ditkivtsi, Homivka and farmstead Manyuky.

Geography 

History 
Mshanets village was first mentioned in 1463. In 1518 the village became the property of Konstanty Ostrogski, a magnate of the Grand Duchy of Lithuania and later a Grand Hetman of Lithuania.
The village was largely destroyed at the time of the First World War. The whole village was evacuated and houses were destroyed. People departed to different parts of Ukraine.

Until 18 July 2020, Mshanets belonged to Zboriv Raion. The raion was abolished in July 2020 as part of the administrative reform of Ukraine, which reduced the number of raions of Ternopil Oblast to three. The area of Zboriv Raion was merged into Ternopil Raion.

Churches and religion 
Mshanetska Parish of the Ukrainian Greek Catholic Church, Temple of St. Archangel Michael (1794, stone, reconstructed).

References

External links/sources 
 weather.in.ua/Zborivs'kyi District/Mshanets'
 Прадідівська слава/Зборівський район/Мшанець 

Villages in Ternopil Raion